Bournemouth is a large coastal resort town in the Borough of Bournemouth in Dorset, England.

Bournemouth may also refer to:

 AFC Bournemouth, an English football team
 Bournemouth (UK Parliament constituency), a former United Kingdom Parliamentary constituency
 Bournemouth F.C., an English football team
 Bournemouth railway station, the main railway station serving the town of Bournemouth
 Bournemouth, in the List of British airships

See also
 Bournemouth Airport
 Bournemouth School
 Bournemouth University
 Bournemouth Gardens